Toto is a 1933 French comedy film directed by Jacques Tourneur and starring Albert Préjean, Renée Saint-Cyr and Félix Oudart.

It was shot at Pathé's Joinville Studios in Paris. The film's sets were designed by the art director Jacques Colombier.

Cast
 Albert Préjean as Toto
 Renée Saint-Cyr as Ginette
 Robert Goupil as Carotte 
 Félix Oudart as L'agent 
 Jim Gérald as Bruno
 Mercédès Brare as Concurente Miss Occasion
 Gabrielle Fontan as La logeuse
 Édouard Francomme as Un prisonnier 
 Anthony Gildès as Le président du jury 
 Pierre Juvenet as Le présentateur du concours 
 Ginette Leclerc as La petite femme

References

Bibliography 
 Oscherwitz, Dayna & Higgins, MaryEllen. The A to Z of French Cinema. Scarecrow Press, 2009.

External links 
 

1933 films
French comedy films
French black-and-white films
1933 comedy films
1930s French-language films
Films shot at Joinville Studios
Films directed by Jacques Tourneur
Pathé films
1930s French films